The Western Region is located in south Ghana, spreads from the Ivory Coast (Comoé District) in the west to the Central region in the east, includes the capital and large twin city of Sekondi-Takoradi on the coast, coastal Axim, and a hilly inland area including Elubo. It includes Ghana's southernmost location, Cape Three Points, where crude oil was discovered in commercial quantities in June 2007. The region covers an area of 13,842 sq. km, and had a population of 2,060,585 at the 2021 Census.

The Western Region enjoys a long coastline that stretches from South Ghana's border with Ivory Coast to the Western region's boundary with the Central Region on the east.

The Western Region has the highest rainfall in Ghana, lush green hills, and fertile soils. There are numerous small and large-scale gold mines along with offshore oil platforms dominate the Western Region economy.

The culture is dominated by the Akans; the main languages are Akan, French and English.

Tourism
The largest rivers are the Ankobra River, the Bia River, and the Pra River in the east, with the Tano River partly forming the western national border. The area is known for the UNESCO World Heritage Site and village of Nzulezo, built entirely on stilts and platforms over water, and the Ankasa Protected Area. There is a series of imposing Portuguese, Dutch, British, and Brandenburgian forts along the coast, built from 1512 on.

Education
The Western region has many post-secondary schools, including teachers' and nursing colleges, and two universities one at Tarkwa, UMaT and Takoradi Technical University formerly known as Takoradi Polythecnic.

Administrative divisions
Before the regional demarcation in December 2018, the region had 23 MMDA's (made up of 1 Metropolitan, 11 Municipal and 11 Ordinary Assemblies). Therefore, as part of this reorganisation, nine MMDA's (those in bold and asterisks below, which were 3 Municipal and 6 Ordinary Assemblies) were removed from the Western Region and formed into a new Western North Region with its new capital at Wiawso. 

The political administration of the region is through the local government system. Under this administration system, the region is divided into 14 MMDA's (made up of 1 Metropolitan, 8 Municipal and 5 Ordinary Assemblies). Each District, Municipal or Metropolitan Assembly, is administered by a Chief Executive, representing the central government but deriving authority from an Assembly headed by a presiding member elected from among the members themselves. The current list is as follows:

Famous native citizens

References

Sources
 Latest list of Regional Ministers in 2008

 
Regions of Ghana
French-speaking countries and territories